Franklin Lee Barrows (October 22, 1844 – February 6, 1922) was a Major League Baseball player for the 1871 Boston Red Stockings.

Sources

1844 births
1922 deaths
Major League Baseball outfielders
Boston Red Stockings players
19th-century baseball players
Baseball players from Ohio
People from Hudson, Ohio